Solidium Oy is a Finnish state-owned investment company. Founded in 1991, Solidium's original purpose was to manage the property of SKOP Bank (Säästöpankkien Keskus-Osake-Pankki; fi), which went bankrupt in the early 1990s recession. In 2008, the purpose of Solidium was changed to manage the listed minority shareholdings of the Finnish Government. Previously, the government directly owned the stock, and transferring them under a single company was the work of Minister of Trade and Industry Jyri Häkämies. On 1 August 2022, the net asset value of Solidium was EUR 8,968 million.

Aside from Solidium, the government still directly owns shares in three listed companies as a majority shareholder.

Holdings 
Solidium took over the state owned shares in 2008 of Kemira, Metso, Outokumpu, Rautaruukki, Sampo, Sponda, Stora Enso and Telia and in 2009 Elisa.

Solidium acquired over 5% of Outotec mining technology company's shares in March 2012 while Goldman Sachs reduced its ownership to less than 5%. 5% is the limit of obligatory stock information note in Finland.

Solidium has bought also Talvivaara mining stocks and sold all shares of Sponda.

Finnish state also directly owns shares of certain publicly listed companies, deemed to be ″strategically important″, that are not in Solidium's portfolio. These include Finnair (55.8%), Fortum (50.8%), and Neste Oil (50.1%).

Corporate governance 
Solidium Oy managing director is Kari Järvinen. The members of Solidium's Board of Directors are chairman (interim) Heikki Bergholm, Markku Hyvärinen (Varma, Tradeka), Marketta Kokkonen (Espoo municipality), Anni Vepsäläinen (Finnish Fair Corporation), and Eero Heliövaara (Ownership steering department of the Prime Minister’s Office).

References

External links
Solidium

Financial services companies of Finland
Government-owned companies of Finland
Sovereign wealth funds